The Little Trout River is a  river in Presque Isle County, Michigan, in the United States.  It is a tributary of Lake Huron.

See also
List of rivers of Michigan

References

Michigan  Streamflow Data from the USGS

Rivers of Michigan
Rivers of Presque Isle County, Michigan
Tributaries of Lake Huron